The 56th Primetime Emmy Awards were held on Sunday, September 19, 2004. The ceremony was hosted by Garry Shandling and was broadcast on ABC.

The HBO miniseries Angels in America had the most successful night. It became the first program to sweep every major category, going 7/7, in Emmy history, until 2020 when Schitt’s Creek repeated the feat. Along with Schitt’s Creek, Caesar's Hour in 1957 and The Crown in 2021, it is one of only four programs to win all four main acting categories.

Upstart comedy series Arrested Development won Outstanding Comedy Series (being the second time Fox won that specific award) and three other major awards overall.  Its pilot became the twelfth episode to accomplish the directing/writing double.

After years of winning everything but the top prize, The Sopranos finally took home the crown for Outstanding Drama Series, not only knocking off four-time defending champion The West Wing but by being the first cable show, HBO, ever to beat any of the Big Four television networks for that award.  It led all dramas with twelve major nominations and four major wins. One of those wins was for Drea de Matteo for Drama Supporting Actress and, too, was the first time that award went to a cable network.  Furthermore, the cable network also won for the first times in the Comedy Lead Actress and Comedy Supporting Actress categories (Sarah Jessica Parker and Cynthia Nixon respectively for Sex and the City).

Entering its final ceremony, five-time series champion Frasier needed five major wins to tie The Mary Tyler Moore Shows record of 27 major wins. Because it was only nominated in five major categories, breaking the record was not possible. Though it did not tie the record, Frasier finished its Emmy career on a high note, winning three major awards, the most it had won since 1998. Its 25 major wins put it at second of all time. When adding its wins in technical categories, its total rises to 37, the most for any comedy series.

Winners and nominees
Winners are listed first and highlighted in bold:

Programs

Acting

Lead performances

Supporting performances

Directing

Writing

Most major nominations
By network 
 HBO – 56
 NBC – 33
 CBS – 19
 ABC – 12

By program
 The Sopranos (HBO) – 12
 Angels in America (HBO) – 11
 Sex and the City (HBO) – 8
 Everybody Loves Raymond (CBS) / The West Wing (NBC) – 7

Most major awards
By network 
 HBO – 16
 NBC / ABC – 4
 Fox – 3
 Comedy Central – 2

By program
 Angels in America (HBO) – 7
 The Sopranos (HBO) – 4
 Arrested Development (Fox) / Frasier (NBC) / The Practice (ABC) – 3

Notes

In Memoriam

Paul Winfield
Alan King
Julia Child
June Taylor
Bob Keeshan
Ethel Winant
Michael Kamen
Jack Elam
Rod Roddy
Jack Paar
Elmer Bernstein
Jerry Goldsmith
Donald O'Connor
Ronald Reagan
Anna Lee
Gordon Jump
Isabel Sanford
Robert Pastorelli
Daniel Petrie
Mary-Ellis Bunim
Ray Charles
Marlon Brando
Peter Ustinov
Art Carney
Tony Randall
Alistair Cooke

References

External links
 Emmys.com list of 2004 Nominees & Winners
 

056
Primetime Emmy Awards
Primetime Emmy
September 2004 events in the United States